Thomas Rayner Dawson (28 November 1889 – 16 December 1951) was an English chess problemist and is acknowledged as "the father of Fairy Chess". He invented many fairy pieces and new conditions. He introduced the popular fairy pieces grasshopper, nightrider, and many other fairy chess ideas.

Career
Dawson published his first problem, a two-mover, in 1907. His chess problem compositions include 5,320 fairies, 885 , 97 selfmates, and 138 endings. 120 of his problems have been awarded prizes and 211 honourably mentioned or otherwise commended. He cooperated in chess composition with Charles Masson Fox.

Dawson was founder-editor (1922–1931) of The Problemist, the journal of the British Chess Problem Society. He subsequently produced The Fairy Chess Review (1930–1951), which began as The Problemist Fairy Chess Supplement. At the same time he edited the problem pages of The British Chess Magazine (1931–1951).

Motivation and personality
From The Oxford Companion to Chess: His genius did not set him apart from his fellows; he could find time for casual visitors, and would explain his ideas to a tyro with patience, modesty, and kindness. Although he won many tourney prizes much of his work was designed to encourage others, to enlarge the small band of fairy problem devotees. He composed less for fame than to amuse himself, confessing to another composer "We do these things for ourselves alone."

Sample problems

Solution: 1. Ka2 2. Ka3 3. Kb4 4. Kc3 5. Kd3 6. Ke2 7. Ke1 8. f1R 9. Rf2 10. Ke2 11. Kd3 12. Kc3 13. Kb4 14. Ka3 15. Ka2 16. Ka1 17. Ra2 Nb3#

This problem is a strange case of coincidence: thematic tourney prescript problems with grasshoppers without limiting number of the moves. The identical problem was sent independently by four composers.

Solution: 1. Gh3 Gh4 2. Gh5 Gh6 3. Gh7 Gh8 4. Ge7 Gd7 5. Gc7 Gb7 6. Ga7+ Ga6 7. Ga5+ Ga4 8. Ga3#

Publications
 Caissa's Playthings a series of articles in Cheltenham Examiner (1913)
 Retrograde Analysis, with Wolfgang Hundsdorfer (1915) 
 Fata Morgana, with Birgfeld, Nanz, Massmann, Pauly (1922)
 Asymmetry, with W. Pauly (1928)
 Seventy Five Retros (1928)
 Caissa's Wild Roses (1935) 
 C. M. Fox, His Problems (1936) 
 Caissa's Wild Roses in Clusters (1937) 
 Ultimate Themes (1938) 
 Caissa's Fairy Tales (1947)

The last five titles were collected as Five Classics of Fairy Chess, Dover Publications (1973), .

References

External links 
 T. R. Dawson: Biography
 The early work of T. R. Dawson by G. P. Jelliss
 Retro-opposition and other retro-analytical chess problems by T. R. Dawson based on Seventy Five Retros; includes further 64 retro-analysis and 3 fairy retros by Dawson
 Retrograde analysis problem by Dawson from Encyclopædia Britannica
 Dawson problems on PDB Server

Chess composers
1889 births
1951 deaths
English male non-fiction writers
English non-fiction writers
English chess players
British chess writers
Game players from Yorkshire
20th-century English male writers